Bayton is an English toponymic surname. Notable people with the surname include:

 John Bayton, English cricketer
 Phil Bayton, British cyclist
 James Arthur Bayton, American psychologist
 Ruth Virginia Bayton, American-born entertainer and actress

See also
 

English toponymic surnames